Verbum was an early personal computer and computer art magazine focusing on interactive art and computer graphics. It was edited and published from 1986 until 1991 by Michael Gosney. It, along with Info 64, was one of the first periodicals  to be entirely based on desktop publishing techniques. Referring to itself as a "journal of personal computer aesthetics," Verbum was notable for placing more emphasis on creative aspects of its subject matter in contrast to the overwhelmingly technical content of other publications.

Overview
It was laid out in PageMaker 1.2 on Macintosh Plus computers and generated camera-ready 300 dpi printout from an Apple LaserWriter Plus. It grew from early black and white content to include color and make use of the growing fields of image manipulation and multimedia. In 1989, Verbum held the first Digital Be-In, which sought to meld the ideals of the 1960s counterculture with the emerging cyberculture of the early 1990s.

Issues
This list of issues and their content is based on information printed in Verbum issues 5.1 and 5.2.

Verbum Interactive
In 1991 the magazine began publishing Verbum Interactive, which was billed as the "first CD-ROM periodical." Verbum Interactive was programmed using MacroMind Director by Michel Kripalani and contained innovative multimedia technologies including digital articles with video, hyperlinks, digital audio files and CD-Audio. It was hailed as a groundbreaking product, but criticized for the high cost of the equipment needed to view it, and for the slow performance of the CD-ROM technology it relied upon. Others commented that "the scope of VI, in terms of both its thematic and intellectual expanse and the level of technological expertise with which the final product was produced, is truly remarkable".

References

Defunct computer magazines published in the United States
Magazines established in 1987
Magazines disestablished in 1991
Quarterly magazines published in the United States